Christa Klaß (also spelled Christa Klass, born  7 November 1951) is a German politician who served as a Member of the European Parliament from 1994 until 2014.

In 1975, Klaß became a qualified master in winemaking and has since been a self-employed wine-grower.

From 1994 Klaß served as a Member of the European Parliament for Rhineland-Palatinate, representing the conservative German Christian Democratic Union, part of the Group of the European People's Party (Christian Democrats) and European Democrats.

External links 
 Christa Klaß 
 Your MEPs: Christa KLASS

1951 births
Living people
Christian Democratic Union of Germany MEPs
MEPs for Germany 1994–1999
MEPs for Germany 1999–2004
MEPs for Germany 2009–2014
MEPs for Germany 2004–2009
20th-century women MEPs for Germany
21st-century women MEPs for Germany
Recipients of the Cross of the Order of Merit of the Federal Republic of Germany
German winemakers
Articles containing video clips